Warren Martin Anderson (November 29, 1921 – September 29, 2014) was an American businessman who was  the chair and CEO of the Union Carbide Corporation (UCC) at the time of the Bhopal disaster in 1984. He was charged with manslaughter by Indian authorities.

Personal life
Anderson was born in 1921 in the Bay Ridge section of Brooklyn, New York, to Swedish immigrants. He was named after the American president Warren Harding. He later attended the naval pre-flight school in Chapel Hill, North Carolina. He married Lillian Anderson. They lived in Bridgehampton, Long Island, New York, and owned houses in Vero Beach, Florida, and Greenwich, Connecticut. He died at a nursing home in Vero Beach, Florida, on September 29, 2014.

Bhopal disaster

The Bhopal disaster took place in a plant belonging to Union Carbide's Indian subsidiary, Union Carbide India Limited, in the city of Bhopal, Madhya Pradesh, India, on the night of 2–3 December 1984. Thousands of people died and hundreds of thousands more were injured in the disaster. As the UCC CEO, Anderson was charged with manslaughter by Indian authorities. He flew to India and was promptly placed in custody by Indian authorities, but was allowed to return to the United States.

He was declared a fugitive from justice by the Chief Judicial Magistrate, Gulab Sharma, of Bhopal on February 1, 1992, for failing to appear at the court hearings in a culpable homicide case. A formal extradition request was issued in 2003. The United States declined to extradite him citing a lack of evidence. The chief judicial magistrate of Bhopal issued an arrest warrant for Anderson on July 31, 2009.

In August 2009, a UCC spokesperson said Union Carbide had no role in operating the plant at the time as the factory was owned, managed and operated by employees of Union Carbide India Limited. Eight former senior employees of the subsidiary were found guilty on June 7, 2010. After these convictions, a UCC spokesperson said, "All the appropriate people from UCIL – officers and those who actually ran the plant on a daily basis – have appeared to face charges."

References

External links 

 The Bhopal Story
 Vor 30 Jahren Das Urteil zur Bhopal-Katastrophe

1921 births
2014 deaths
American people of Swedish descent
Bhopal disaster
Businesspeople from New York City
Colgate University alumni
People from Bay Ridge, Brooklyn
People from Bridgehampton, New York
Fugitives wanted by India